Bourj Hammoud (also spelled Burj Hammud;) is a town and municipality in Lebanon located north-east of the capital Beirut, in the Matn District, and is part of Greater Beirut. The town is heavily populated by Armenians.

Bourj Hammoud is a mixed residential, industrial and commercial area and is one of the most densely populated districts in the Middle East. Bourj Hammoud has a major waterfront (river and sea) at Beirut's north gateway that, however, underwent an anarchic urban development.

History

Early history 
Today known as "The City of Life" was exhausted Armenians who had survived the death marches in Deir ez-Zor (Syria) arrived in Beirut after the collapse of the Ottoman Empire, they were given the right to construct shacks on the eastern banks of the Beirut River that was at the time swamps and marshy lands. They were then allowed to erect houses and buildings which stand to this day. In 1952, Bourj Hammoud became an independent municipality and is currently a member of the Metn-North group of municipalities.

The founding father of Bourj Hammoud and its municipality was the Armenian Catholic Father Paul Ariss who was instrumental in laying the foundations of a bustling city and center for the Lebanese Armenian community and served a long time as its mayor. The municipality named a main street in Bourj Hammoud in his name in acknowledgement of his sizable contributions to the establishment and development of the city.

During its founding and early settlement, Bourj Hammoud was also the focus of a rivalry between two Armenian political parties, the Armenian Revolutionary Federation and the Social Democrat Hunchakian Party, who struggled to control the newly established shanty-town. This led to various altercations and assassinations that gripped the Armenian community of Lebanon. This was climaxed during the Lebanon crisis of 1958, around the time where the two parties and their supporters became polarized due to a religious dispute over which catholicos would be the leader of the Armenian Apostolic Church. However, in the midst of increasing sectarian strife in the late 1960s and early 1970s, Lebanon's Armenian community began to close ranks, and in 1972, the Hunchakian Party ran a joint ticket with the Dashnaks.

Civil war
The Lebanese Civil War threatened the existence of Beirut's Armenian community. Armenians felt the need to stick close to each other during those turbulent times, thus, they assembled in Bourj Hammoud. Armenian presence was already evident in Bourj Hammoud by its multiple Armenian community centers and churches.

During the Lebanese Civil War, many young Armenians took arms to defend it from the opposing forces. However, the Armenian Revolutionary Federation, the Armenian political party representing most Armenians in the diaspora, tried its best to remain neutral. Because of the Armenian policy of neutrality, Maronite militia groups kept the inhabitants of Bourj Hammoud under strong pressure, even attacking the quarter of Bourj Hammoud.

2006 Israel-Lebanon conflict
During the 2006 Israel-Lebanon conflict, refugees were welcomed into Bourj Hammoud's churches, schools and other complexes where they were fed and given shelters. After the conflict, Turkey proposed to send some of its troops to Lebanon as a part of UNIFIL. Most Armenians strongly opposed Turkish involvement. They held demonstrations against the Turkish force in Bourj Hammoud.

Geography

Bourj Hammoud is located just off of the highway and surrounded by the communities of Dora, Karantina, Sin el Fil and Achrafieh.

Most residential buildings and houses in Bourj Hammoud were built from the 1930s to the 1970s. They are usually from two to four stories high. The housing structure looks Balkan, with wooden balconies hanging over the mostly narrow streets of the suburb. Most commercial activity is done at street level. The city is dynamic and industrious although it faces some environmental issues due to its location at the edge of Beirut. It is crisscrossed by motorways and turns its back to the sea, from which it has reclaimed a few hectares of land. Bourj Hammoud has a large number of churches, schools, cultural centers and institutions located in its vicinity.

Demographics 
While a widespread stereotype persists in Lebanon that Bourj Hammoud is an Armenian-majority location, a study by a Christian NGO in 2006 found evidence contradicting this claim. In the study, it was reported that only one district of the city was actually populated mainly by Armenians, and the city was actually composed of other Christian groups.

See also
Armenians in Lebanon
List of Armenian ethnic enclaves
The Fifth Column

References

External links

Populated places in the Matn District
Christian cities in Lebanon
Shia Muslim communities in Lebanon
Armenian communities in Lebanon
Neighbourhoods of Beirut